Love Is Wicked is the only studio album by Brick & Lace. It had an initial release date of August 21, 2007, then it got moved to December 4, 2007, but then was pushed back further to 2008. It was eventually released in the UK and France. The album was also released in other countries (such as Belgium) in September 2007. It has since then leaked onto the internet on various blog sites. Love Is Wicked is a mix of R&B and dance music with hip hop and reggae-dancehall elements.

Production came from Akon, as well as will.i.am, Cool & Dre, Jazze Pha and many others. The only guest appearance known at the moment, will come from Cham, who will be on the remix of the album's lead single, "Never Never". Akon has produced three songs for the album. This album, when released, will earn a place in the label's history as it is also the first release on Akon's Kon Live Distribution label.

Track listing
"Get That Clear (Hold Up)" (Produced by Akon)
"Never Never" (Produced by Akon)
"Don't Stop" (Produced by Full Force & Johnny Nice)
"Take Me Back" (Produced by Perry Alexander & Tal Herzberg)
"Why'd You Lie?" (Produced by Full Force & Johnny Nice)
"Love Is Wicked" (Produced by Steven Marsden, Ron Fair, Abraham Laboriel Jr. & Mateo Laboriel)
"Boyfriend" (Co-written by Taurian "Adonis" Shropshire / Produced by Akon)
"Push It Up" (Produced by Tony Kelly)
"Buss A Shot" (Produced by will.i.am)
"Mr. Officer" (Produced by Cool & Dre)
"My Apple" (Co-written by Ezekiel Lewis of The Clutch / Produced by The Movement)
"U And Me" (Produced by The Triads)

Re-Release Track listing
"Love Is Wicked" (Produced by Steven Marsden, Ron Fair, Abraham Laboriel Jr. & Mateo Laboriel)
"Bad to Di Bone" (Produced by Chris Birch)
"Buss A Shot" (Produced by will.i.am)
"Take Me Back" (Produced by Perry Alexander & Tal Herzberg)
"Cry On Me" (Produced by Delano Thomas)
"Room Service" (Produced by Chris Birch)
"Get That Clear (Hold Up)" (Produced by Akon)
"Push It Up" (Produced by Tony Kelly)
"Why'd You Lie?" (Produced by Full Force & Johnny Nice)(featuring B-U-D Ramsay)
"Don't Stop" (Produced by Full Force & Johnny Nice)
"U And Me" (Produced by The Triads)
"Never Never" (Produced by Akon)

Personnel
Adam Alexander: Composer
Perry Alexander: Producer
Mark Barnes: Marketing Coordinator
James "Chip" Bunton: Composer
David Cabrera: Bass, Guitar
Manu Chao: Composer
AJ Crimson: Makeup
Charlene Curry: Studio Assistant
Nabil Elderkin: Photography
Ron Fair: Bass, Composer, Executive Producer, Keyboards, Producer, String Arrangements, String Conductor
Full Force: Composer, Engineer, Guest Appearance, Performer, Producer, Vocal Arrangement, Background Vocals
Marcus T. Grant: Management
Maurice Gregory: Composer
Hylah Hedgepeth: Art Direction
Tal Herzberg: Producer
Daria Hines: Stylist
Shawn "Tubby" Holiday: A&R
Anthony Kelly: Composer
Padraic Kerin: Engineer
Abraham Laboriel, Sr: Producer
Mateo Laboriel: Producer
Steven "Lenky" Marsden: Composer, Producer
Peter Mokran: Mixing
Eddie Montilla: Keyboards
Dave Pensado: Mixing
Chris Perry: Composer
Paul Simon: Composer
Devyne Stephens: Creative Assistance
Adonis Stropshire: Composer
Aliaune Thiam: Bass, Composer, Drums, Guest Appearance, Producer, Programming
Giorgio Tuinfort: Composer, Producer, Programming
Andrew Van Meter: Production Coordination
Seth Waldman: Mixing Assistant
Eric Weaver: Mixing Assistant
Josh Wilbur: Engineer
will.i.am: Drum Programming, Producer
Gita Williams: Marketing
Kiyah Wright: Hair Stylist

Singles
Singles from Love Is Wicked:
"Get That Clear (Hold Up)"
"Never, Never"
"Love Is Wicked"
"Take Me Back"
"Bad to Di Bone"

Charts

References

2007 debut albums
Brick & Lace albums
Albums produced by Akon